The 2019 South Korean Capitol attack occurred on December 16, 2019, when supporters of the Liberty Korea Party, Our Republican Party, and Taegeukgi units attempted to enter the Korea National Assembly Proceeding Hall.

Attack on the Capitol 
On December 16, 2019, the Liberty Korea Party, Korea's mainstream conservative party, held "The contest to condemn the revision of the CIO Act and the Election Act" with the Taegeuk squad and illegally invaded the National Assembly on the same day. In front of the National Assembly, they used violence by spitting on Justice Party members, grabbing their hair and shaking them. They also assaulted Sul Hoon, a member of the Democratic Party of Korea.

Two years later, South Korean media compared the incident to the 2021 United States Capitol attack. In the American attack, however, lawmakers were not victims of direct physical violence.

References

External links
 Namuwiki - 2019 Capitol intrusion (In Korean)

Liberty Korea Party
Anti-communism in South Korea
South Korea
Far-right politics in South Korea
Protests in South Korea
Attacks on legislatures
Political riots